Quietus is the site of a former town, centered on a post office now closed, and a community in the surrounding area. It was located in Big Horn County, Montana, United States. No one lives at the site of the former town. The surrounding area is now an unincorporated community. It appears on the U.S. Geological Survey Map.

History
Quietus was established as a post office in 1907 to service homesteaders and ranchers living in the valleys of the Otter and Quietus Creeks. Though never a large community, the local population eventually dwindled to less than a dozen residents, until the post office closed in 1957. Today, Quietus is a "ghost town," the loop road and the post office building remains, though it has collapsed.

Etymology
According to local anecdote Frank  Brittain sent a list of fifteen names with the town's application for a post office in 1914, and all of them were rejected.  "Well, I guess they put a quietus on that," Brittain said to his wife.  She saw the opportunity, and renewed the application, and a few weeks later the name Quietus was approved.

References

Unincorporated communities in Big Horn County, Montana
Unincorporated communities in Montana